Odostomia satura is a species of sea snail, a marine gastropod mollusc in the family Pyramidellidae, the pyrams and their allies.

Description
The white shell has a medium size and is broadly conic. Its length measures 6.4 mm. The whorls of the protoconch number at least
two. They form a depressed spire, the axis of which is almost at a right angle to the axis of the later whorls, and which is deeply, somewhat obliquely immersed in the first turn of the teleoconch . The 5½ whorls of the teleoconch are moderately well rounded, and faintly shouldered at the summit. They are marked all over by irregular rough, low, tumescenses, which simulate obsolete vertical ribs. The sutures are  simple, and well marked. The periphery of the body whorl is well rounded. The base of the shell is quite short, decidedly rounded, and umbilicated. The umbilicus is partly covered by the revolute columella. The aperture is large, very broadly oval, and somewhat effuse anteriorly. The posterior angle is obtuse. The outer lip is thick. The columella is moderately strong, oblique, decidedly curved, with a decided oblique fold, situated considerably anterior to its insertion. The parietal wall is covered by a fairly
thick callus.

Distribution
This species occurs in the Pacific Ocean off Washington, USA

References

External links
 To World Register of Marine Species
 To ITIS

satura
Gastropods described in 1865